The Merchant Navy Medal for Meritorious Service is a state award within the British honours system. The medal is awarded to no more than 20 recipients annually who are announced on Merchant Navy Day, 3 September. A 'Merchant Navy Medal' with the same criteria was awarded by the Merchant Navy Welfare Board from 2005, before being superseded by the state award in 2015.

Criteria
The medal may be awarded to those individuals who are serving, or have served, in the Merchant Navy or the fishing fleets of the United Kingdom, the Isle of Man, and the Channel Islands. Recipients must have shown particularly valuable devotion to duty and exemplary service so as to serve as an outstanding example to others. Recipients will typically have given 20 years of good conduct and exemplary service, although awards have also been made for brave conduct. Annually, no more than 20 medals are awarded. Recipients are entitled to use the post-nominal letters of MNM.

Appearance
The obverse bears the Ian Rank-Broadley effigy of Her Majesty The Queen. The reverse depicts the badge of the Merchant Navy: the letters MN surrounded by a rope joined at the base by a reef knot, a naval crown surmounts the rope, with the inscription 'FOR MERITORIOUS SERVICE'. The  name of the recipient is impressed on the rim of the Medal. 

The previous Merchant Navy Medal displayed a portrait of Lord Nelson on the obverse with the Merchant Navy logo on the reverse. As it was not an official state award, it could not be worn in uniform alongside official medals.

References

External links

Orders, decorations, and medals of the United Kingdom
Civil awards and decorations of the United Kingdom
British Merchant Navy
Awards established in 2015
2015 establishments in the United Kingdom
Long and Meritorious Service Medals of Britain and the Commonwealth